The  Edmonton Eskimos season was the 53rd season for the team in the Canadian Football League and their 62nd overall. After the Eskimos lost the final game of the season, they were eliminated from playoff contention, despite winning five of their last seven games.

This is also the first time since 2004 that a Grey Cup host city has failed to qualify for the playoffs.

Off-season

CFL draft

Notable transactions

*Later traded to the Montreal Alouettes
**Later traded to the Hamilton Tiger-Cats

Pre-season

Regular season

Standings

Season schedule

The September 26 game was played in Moncton, New Brunswick where the Argonauts were the designated home team.

Total attendance: 315,224 
Average attendance: 35,205 (58.8%)

Roster

Statistics
As of the end of Week 13 (Game 12):

Passing

Rushing

Receiving

Awards

2010 CFL All-Stars
Chris Thompson

CFL Western All-Stars
WR – Fred Stamps, CFL Western All-Star
DB – Chris Thompson, CFL Western All-Star

Playoffs
After finishing last in the West division, the Eskimos failed to qualify for the 2010 CFL playoffs.

References

Edmonton Eskimos Season, 2010
Edmonton Elks seasons